The 2008–09 New York Islanders season was the 37th season in franchise history. On April 14, 2009, the Islanders won the NHL Draft Lottery to receive the first overall draft pick in the 2009 NHL Entry Draft.

Regular season
Captain Bill Guerin was traded to the Pittsburgh Penguins in March. The captaincy was left vacant for the rest of the season.

Divisional standings

Conference standings

Schedule and results

Playoffs
The New York Islanders did not qualify for the 2009 Stanley Cup Playoffs.

Player statistics

Skaters

Goaltenders

†Denotes player spent time with another team before joining Islanders. Stats reflect time with Islanders only.
‡Traded mid-season. Stats reflect time with Islanders only.

Awards and records

Records

Milestones

Transactions

Trades

Free agents

Claimed from waivers

Draft picks
The Islanders picks at the 2008 NHL Entry Draft in Ottawa, Ontario.

Farm teams
The Bridgeport Sound Tigers of the American Hockey League, the Utah Grizzlies of the ECHL, and the Odessa Jackalopes of the Central Hockey League are the Islanders' minor league affiliates for the 2008–09 season.

See also
 2008–09 NHL season

References

New York Islanders seasons
New York Islanders
New York Islanders
New York Islanders
New York Islanders